The 1929 Cork Junior Hurling Championship was the 33rd staging of the Cork Junior Hurling Championship since its establishment by the Cork County Board.

On 2 March 1930, Bandon won the championship following a 2–05 to 2–01 defeat of Ballinora in the final at the Cork Athletic Grounds. It was their first ever championship title.

References

Cork Junior Hurling Championship
Cork Junior Hurling Championship